The Bin Ladens: An Arabian Family in the American Century is a New York Times best-selling book written by two-time Pulitzer Prize-winning author Steve Coll in 2008. The book illustrates the story of the Bin Laden family's rise to power and privilege, with Coll's journalistic investigation revealing how American influences affected the family and how one member, Osama bin Laden, led a rebellion that changed the United States of America.

Recognition
CODES Notable Books Council Award Winner
Pulitzer Prize for Biography or Autobiography Finalist
National Book Critics Circle Award Finalist
Los Angeles Times Book Prize Finalist.
PEN/John Kenneth Galbraith Award

References 

2008 non-fiction books
American non-fiction books
Works about families
Bin Laden family